Albert Thomas Bouchard (born May 24, 1947) is an American musician. He is a founding member and the original drummer of the hard rock band Blue Öyster Cult and current drummer of The Dictators. He is the brother of former Blue Öyster Cult bassist Joe Bouchard.

Biography  
Bouchard was born in Watertown, New York, and grew up in Clayton, New York. He was a founding member of the hard rock band Blue Öyster Cult and a driving force through the band's first decade.

In 1981, Bouchard left Blue Öyster Cult. He began to work on an intended solo album that would become the album Imaginos (1988) released under the BÖC name.

He has also played on records for Mike Watt (a version of BÖC's "Dominance and Submission" for the flip side of Watt's 1995 single "E Ticket Ride" ),  and Richie Stotts (Plasmatics), Gumball and Fabienne Shine. Bouchard has produced records for many other musicians, including Maria Excommunikata, Heads Up! and David Roter.

Until 2006, Bouchard's main musical project had been Brain Surgeons, with whom he released several CDs on his own Cellsum Records label. Cellsum grew to host a number of other artists, including Les Vegas, The X Brothers, David Roter and Helen Wheels. In 2007, Bouchard formed Ünderbelly with original Soft White Underbelly singer Les Braunstein, Brain Surgeons bassist David Hirschberg, and guitarist Adrian Romero. They were featured on the 2008 Motörhead tribute CD Sheep in Wolves' Clothing, and released the songs "Critical Mass" and "Astronomy" in 2011.

In 2008, Bouchard formed the band 'Blue Coupe' with his brother Joe and original Alice Cooper bassist Dennis Dunaway. Originally an Alice Cooper/Blue Öyster Cult cover act, 'Blue Coupe' has released three albums of original material: Tornado on the Tracks in 2010, Million Miles More in 2013, and Eleven Even in 2019. In 2014, Bouchard released his first solo record, Incantation, which was followed in 2017 by a second album, Surrealist.

Bouchard released a new album in November 2020, titled Re Imaginos, a mostly acoustic version of the album Imaginos, and released a follow-up Imaginos 2: Bombs Over Germany (Minus Zero And Counting) in 2021. Bouchard is working on the third and final album of his Imaginos trilogy, The Mutant Reformation.

References

External links 
Albert Bouchard's web page
2012 Audio Interview with Albert Bouchard from the Podcast "I'd Hit That"
Blue Coupe web site

American heavy metal drummers
American male singer-songwriters
American rock singers
American rock songwriters
Blue Öyster Cult members
Living people
1947 births
People from Watertown, New York
People from Clayton, New York
20th-century American drummers
American male drummers
Singer-songwriters from New York (state)